The Abraham Schell House is a historic two-story house located in Knights Ferry, California. It was first built out of sandstone in 1856 for Abraham and Catherine Schell, owners of the Rancho del Río Estanislao.

References

Houses in Stanislaus County, California